FK Neratovice-Byškovice is a Czech football club located in the town of Neratovice. It currently plays in Divize B in the Czech Fourth Division. In the summer of 2011, the club was promoted to the Fourth Division administratively, following a third-placed finish in the regional championship and the withdrawal of the Příbram B team from competitive football.

References

External links
  
 FK Neratovice-Byškovice at the Středočeský Fotbal website 

Football clubs in the Czech Republic
Association football clubs established in 2006
Mělník District
2006 establishments in the Czech Republic